Thomas Brown William Niven (15 March 1834 – 17 December 1914) was a Scottish minister. He served as Moderator of the General Assembly of the Church of Scotland in 1906.

Life

Thomas was born in the manse at  Balfron on 15 March 1834 the son of Rev Dr Alexander Niven, the local minister since 1825. He came from a long line of Scottish clergy. He was educated privately then studied divinity at the University of Edinburgh.

He began his ministry in May 1858 at the Mission in Renton, West Dunbartonshire but within a year moved to assist at St George's Church in Edinburgh. Through a connection to the Earl of Stair he was ordained to preach at Cranstoun in October 1859. In 1868 he moved to the Glasgow Tron Church. In 1872 he moved again to Linlithgow where he found the manse pleasing. However, his puritanical spirit called him to a more humble life, and he moved back to do Mission work in 1876, this time in Pollokshields one of Glasgow's poorer districts. He stayed here for the remainder of his working life, living at Coldstream House on Albert Road. In 1893 the University of Edinburgh awarded him an honorary doctorate (DD).

He retired in 1911 and was succeeded by Rev Norman Caie DD. He retired to the New Town in Edinburgh living at 40 Northumberland Street.

He died on 17 December 1914.

References

1834 births
1914 deaths
Alumni of the University of Edinburgh
Moderators of the General Assembly of the Church of Scotland
19th-century Ministers of the Church of Scotland
20th-century Ministers of the Church of Scotland